Michael Sauer (born 27 August 1941 in Recklinghausen) is a German former triple jumper who competed in the 1968 Summer Olympics.

Sauer became West German champion every year from 1963 to 1971 except for 1966. Indoors he became West German champion every year from 1963 to 1972, won a national bronze medal every year from 1973 to 1976 and a last gold medal in 1979. He represented the club TSV 1860 München early on, then USC Mainz.

References

1941 births
Living people
German male triple jumpers
West German male triple jumpers
Olympic athletes of West Germany
Athletes (track and field) at the 1968 Summer Olympics
Universiade medalists in athletics (track and field)
TSV 1860 München athletes
USC Mainz athletes
Universiade gold medalists for West Germany
People from Recklinghausen
Sportspeople from Münster (region)
Recipients of the Cross of the Order of Merit of the Federal Republic of Germany